Josip Zovko (4 June 1970 – 3 April 2019) was a Croatian actor and director.  A native of the Berinovac, Lokvičići municipality in the Imotska Krajina he was best known for playing Joze in the television series Naši i vaši. He was also acclaimed for his roles in the films Sorry for Kung Fu and Wish I Were a Shark.

Biography and studies
Zovko was born on June 4, 1970 in Split. He graduated from the Academy of Dramatic Art in Zagreb and in 1993 he became a member of the Croatian National Theater ensemble in Split, also known as HNK Split, where he played many roles. At the Theater of Split he was a student of Mustafa Nadarević with whom Zovko had been on the stage many times.

Early career
 
Zovko's first television appearance was in 1997 when he appeared in the theater play "Mali libar Marka Uvodića Splićanina". He later played the character “Mate” in the movie "Da mi je biti morski pas" (If I could be a shark) in 1999. Zovko won several awards at the 46th Pula Film Festival.

Starting in 2001, Zovko had one of the main roles in the movie "Ante se vraća kući" (Ante is Returning home). He played the character “Kole”, a student from Dalmatia. In the movie "Holding" he played a smaller role as a little brother. In the same year he played a waiter on a cruise ship in the movie "Posljedna Volja" (The Last Will), with fellow Croatian actor Goran Višnjić.

Zovko played the character “Jozo” in the Croatian TV series “Naši i vaši“ (Ours and Yours) (2000-2002) along with the actor Vedran Mlikota. In this series both actors played men from “Hercegovina” who came to Zagreb. The story goes that both were under the impression that college would be easy since they knew the professor, but it turned out that they actually had to study hard to finish college. Josip Zovko also appeared in the movie “Sorry for Kung Fu“ as „Ćaćo“ in 2004. In the TV movie "Trešet" from the year 2006 Josip acted as a cop named "Prekrasni Um" (Beautiful Mind). Domestic people had the desire to corrupt him and lure him to their side because they saw a benefit for themselves. In the movie "Najvećoj pogrešci Alberta Einsteina (The Biggest Mistake of Albert Einstein), Josip acted as a stranger. In 2008, Josip Zovko opened the role in “Bitange i Princeze“. In 2009 he appeared as "Roko" in the movie “Vjerujem u anđele“ (I believe in Angels), where Oliver Dragojević also participated. In 2011 Josip played a Yugoslav Partisan in the movie “Bella Biondina”.

In the music video of the singer Miroslav Škoro (2003) “Tamo gdje je dom“ (There Where the House Is) Zovko played a knight who is fighting for his homeland.

Death
Josip Zovko was killed in a car crash in Grudsko Vrilo (close to Grude) in Bosnia and Herzegovina and was buried at the cemetery Sveti Ante in Lokvičići on April 6.  A memorial service was held in his honor on April 12, 2019, attended by friends and acting colleagues.

Filmography

Film

 "Bella Biondina" as Yugoslav Partisan (2011)
 "Vjerujem u anđele" as Roko (2009)
 "Najveća pogreška Alberta Einsteina" as stranger (2006)
 "Trešeta" as Beautiful Mind (2006)
 "Oprosti za kung fu" as Ćaćo (2004)
 "Posljednja volja" as waiter on a cruise ship (2001)
 "Holding" as Tein little brother (2001)
 "Ante se vraća kući" as Kole (2001)
 "Da mi je biti morski pas" as Mate (1999)
 "Mali libar Marka Uvodića Splićanina" (1997)

Television
 "Bitange i princeze" as Peraica (2008)
 "Naši i vaši" as Jozo (2001-2002)

Music videos
 Miroslav Skoro "Tamo gdje je dom" (There Where the House Is) as a knight, 2003

Theatre HNK Split
Eugène Ionesco Nosorog as Drugi građanin, Vatrogasac, Prvi čovjek, zbor), 2017                     
William Shakespeare Mletački trgovac as Tubal, 2016                                                     
Ante Tomić Čudo u poskokovoj dragi as Don Stipe, 2014                                            
Jean – Baptiste Poquelin Molière Učene žene as Bilježnik, 2014                                               
Bertolt Brecht Majka courage i njezina djeca as Vrbovnik, drugi narednik, 2013                        
William Shakespeare Timon Atenjanin as Slikar, 2013                                                                 
Dino Pešut Pritisci moje generacije as Muškarac, 2013                                                               
Milan Begović Amerikanska jahta u splitkskoj luci as Lee Prentice, 2013                                       
William Shakespeare Romeo i Julija as Escalo, 2012                                                                  
Ivo Brešan Svečana večera u pogrebnom poduzeću Grobar Fiki, as Bosanac, 2011                                         *Euripides Hekuba as Taltibije, Glasnik helenski, 2011.                                                         
Arthur Miller Smrt trgovačkog putnika (Death of a Salesman) as Howard Wagner, 2011                                      
Sanja Ivić Tartuffeerie as Inspicijent, 2011                                                                        
Simon Bent Elling as Frank Ashley), 2010                                                                            
Lada Kaštelan Prije sna as Mate 2009                                                                                
Marin Držić Skup as Drijemalo, 2008                                                                                  
Eduardo De Filippo Velika magija as Policijski brigadir, Gregorio, Calogerov brat, 2008                             
Nina Mitrović Kad se mi mrtvi pokoljemo as Fazo, Izbjeglica, Musliman, 2007                                         
Tom Stoppard Rosenkranz i Guildstern su mrtvi  (Rosenkrantz and Guildenstern are Dead), 2006                                                  
Renato Baretić Osmi povjernik as Bart Kvasinožić, Muonin muž, Anthonyijev otac), 2005                               
Tennessee Williams  Noć iguane as Hank, 2005                                                                        
Lada Martinac Kralj, prema Ranku Marinkoviću Otok svetog ciprijana as Mićel,2004                                     
Arijana Čulina Jo ča je život lip as Čep, 2004                                                                       *Tonči Petrasov Marović Antigona, kraljica u tebi as Drugi stražar, 2004.                                     
Ferenc Molnár Liliom as Drugi policajac, ujedno i Drugi nebeski policajac, 2004                                     
Jean-Baptiste Poquelin Molière Don Juan as Gusman, Elvirin konjušar), 2003                          
Sergi Belbel Poslije kiše as Informatički programer, 2003.                                      
Bernard-Marie Koltès Roberto Zucco as Drugi čuvar, inspektor, drugi policajac, 2002                                 
Vlaho Stulli Kate Kapuralica as Manoval, Vlaj, 2002                                                
Tennessee Williams Tetovirana ruža / Serafin Splićanka as Doktor, 2001 
Edmond Rostand Cyrano de Bergerac as Christian de Neuvillette, 2000                              
Sophocles Antigona as Hemon, 2000                                                                           
Luigi Pirandello Šest lica traži Autora as Sin, 2000                                                      
Ivan Leo Lemo – Ana Tonković Dolenčić Plinska boca as Svećenik, 2000                  
Arsen Dedić Kuća pored Mora, ballet as interpretator, 2000                                           
Mate Matišić Svećenikova djeca as Don Šimun, 1999                                             
William Shakespeare Na tri kralja as Antonio, pomorski kapetan, 1999     
Anton Pavlovič Čehov Galeb as Ilja Afanasjevič Šamrajev, Upravnik kod Sorina), 1998                                 
Fjodor Mihajlovič Dostojevski Braća Karamazovi as Rakitin, 1998       
Dubravko Mihanović Bijelo as Mali, 1998                                               
Antun Šoljan Tarampesta / Mototor as Marino), 1997                                            
Ray Cooney Pokvarenjak as Ronnie, 1997                                                                               
William Shakespeare Kralj Lear as Francuski kralj, 1997                               
Jean-Baptiste Poquelin Molière Tartuffe as Valere, 1996                                
Ivan Antun Nenadić Kako je izdan Isus as Apostol Ivan, 1996                                   
Carlo Goldoni Posljednja noć karnevala as Redatelj, 1996                                      
Ivo Brešan Julije Cezar as Tinko Metikoš, 1995                                            
John Webster Vojvotkinja Malfeška as Grisolan, dvorjanin, sluga, ubojica, 1995                                       
Sophocles Edip as Mladić, 1994                                                                         
Hugo von Hofmannsthal Svatković as Susjed siromah, 1994                      
Joseph Kesselring Arsen i stara Čipka as Klein, policajac, 1994                                
William Shakespeare Hamlet as Drugi glumac, 1994                        
Miroslav Krleža Saloma as Ađutant, Pjesnik, Kuhar, 1993                                  
Lada Martinac - Snježana Sinovčić Živim as Grof, 1993                                  
Claudio Magris Stadelmann as Konobar, 1992                                       
Tomislav Bakarić Smrt Stjepana Radića as Narodni zastupnici, 1992       
Ray Cooney Kidaj od svoje žene as Fotograf, 1992                                           
Muka spasitelja našega as Anđeli i alegorije, 1991                                
Euripides Helena, 1990.

Performances outside Split Theatre 
 Mail Libar Marka Uvodića Splićanina, GKM Split
 performance Ilija Zovko, regie / direction Josip Zovko, GKM Split

Film awards and special honors 
 Croatian actress prize for role of Mate in TV movie To be a shark, directed by Ognjen Sviličić, 2000.
 Award Veljko Maričić at the International Small Scene Festival for the role of Little in the performance of Bijelo Dubravko Mihanović, directed by John Leo Leme, 1998.

References

External links

1970 births
2019 deaths
20th-century Croatian male actors
Actors from Split, Croatia
21st-century Croatian male actors
Croatian male film actors
Croatian male stage actors
Croatian male television actors
Burials in Croatia
Road incident deaths in Bosnia and Herzegovina